Saint Patrick Catholic Church is a Catholic church in Los Angeles, California. It is located just east of Downtown Los Angeles and is one of the oldest parishes in Los Angeles.

History
St. Patrick's was established in 1907. The parish has served a variety of communities over its more than hundred years. St. Patrick's has always been a parish for welcoming immigrants - starting with Irish and Germans in the 1900s, African Americans in the 1920s and 1930s, Mexicans in the 1950s and now Central Americans since the 1980s.

Destruction & re-construction of the building
The original church building had to be reconstructed after an earthquake in 1933 destroyed its famous towers. The 1971 San Fernando earthquake completely destroyed the church. As a result, the parish - unable to afford the cost of rebuilding - was forced to worship in the converted parish hall for   thirty-five years. With an average attendance of over 600 worshippers, but a maximum capacity of only 402, many parishioners were forced to stand outside the door to the parish hall in order to attend Mass.

Through the inspiration of Bishop Stephen Blaire and Monsignor Lloyd Torgerson (pastor at St. Monica Catholic Church in Santa Monica, California), the idea was born of building a church for St. Patrick's Parish with the help of all the parishes and Catholic donors within Our Lady of the Angels Pastoral Region. The unique capital campaign involved donations from the 77 parishes within the Our Lady of the Angels regions as well as contributions from individual donors and foundations. Under the leadership of Bishop Edward William Clark, the construction of the new church commenced in April 2005. Dedication of the new St. Patrick's Church was held March 17, 2007 (St. Patrick's Day 2007). One thousand worshipers are now able to celebrate Mass in the new St. Patrick's.

Parish at a Glance 
 Number of known households: 1,500
 Number of regular parishioners: 5,000
 Average income for a family of six: $31,634
 Annual baptisms: 475
 Number of students in weekly religious education classes: 700
 Present building seating capacity: 402
 Average attendance per Mass: 600
 Projected seating capacity in new church: 1,000
 Percentage increase in the projected five year local Catholic population: 9.6%

Church building 
It has been a long time since the St. Patrick Parish has had a permanent church. In 1971 the church, constructed of un-reinforced masonry, was completely destroyed by the 1971 San Fernando earthquake. Re-building is not new to the parishioners of St. Patrick's. In 1933 the church was very heavily damaged by an earthquake and rebuilt.  Construction on the new church building was begun in April 2005.  The opening of St. Patrick's was celebrated in March 2007.  One thousand worshipers are now able to celebrate Mass in the new St. Patrick's - more than doubling the present capacity of the current worship space in the parish hall. The unique capital campaign involved donations from the 77 parishes within the Our Lady of the Angels regions as well as contributions from individual donors and foundations.

References

African-American history in Los Angeles
German-American culture in California
Hispanic and Latino American culture in Los Angeles
Irish-American culture in California
Mexican-American culture in Los Angeles
Roman Catholic Archdiocese of Los Angeles
Roman Catholic churches in Los Angeles
Patrick
Christian organizations established in 1903
Roman Catholic churches completed in 2005
21st-century Roman Catholic church buildings in the United States